Alltwen (or Allt-wen; translates to "white wooded slope") is a village in the Swansea Valley (Welsh: Cwmtawe) in Wales. Alltwen forms part of the community of Cilybebyll and is administered separately from adjoining Pontardawe on the opposite bank of the River Tawe.

Alltwen is served by Alltwen Primary School and the village has a rugby union club, Alltwen RFC (Welsh: Clwb Rygbi Alltwen).

Government and politics
Allt-wen is an electoral ward of Neath Port Talbot county borough and is a part of the community of Cilybebyll. The ward is bounded by Trebanos and Pontardawe to the northwest; Rhos to the northeast; Bryn-côch North to the southeast; Dyffryn to the south; and Clydach (in Swansea) to the southwest.

Most of Allt-wen consists of farmland and woods. Occupying a strip of land in the northwest of the ward is Alltwen village, which is part of the built-up area surrounding Pontardawe.

Notable people
 Alltwen was the home of Ronnie James, British Lightweight Boxing Champion in the 1940s and World Title challenger in 1946
 Rachel Thomas (actress), born in the village
 Siân Phillips, much of her childhood  in the village
 Justin Tipuric, born in the village before moving to Trebanos as a child
 D. Gwenallt Jones, born in Pontardawe, was raised in Alltwen

Pubs
Clwb Rygbi Alltwen
The Butchers Arms
The Gwyn Arms
The New Lodge

References

External links
The History of Pontardawe by John E Morgan [Hirfryn] 1911
Alltwen Primary School
South Wales Travel Guide - Welsh Holiday Cottages
www.geograph.co.uk : photos of Alltwen and surrounding area

Electoral wards of Neath Port Talbot
Swansea Valley
Villages in Neath Port Talbot